Cho Soon-seung (22 March 1929 – 5 February 2022) was a South Korean politician.

A member of the Peace Democratic Party, the Democratic Party, and the National Congress for New Politics, he served in the National Assembly from 1988 to 2000. He died on 5 February 2022, at the age of 92.

References

1929 births
2022 deaths
20th-century South Korean politicians
Peace Democratic Party politicians
Seoul National University alumni
University of Michigan alumni
Academic staff of Yonsei University
Academic staff of Korea University
People from South Jeolla Province